Cerklje may refer to places in Slovenia:

 Cerklje na Gorenjskem, town and seat of
 Municipality of Cerklje na Gorenjskem
 Cerklje ob Krki and nearby
 Cerklje ob Krki Barracks
 Cerklje ob Krki Airport